Ruslan Danilyuk (born 12 May 1974) is a retired Belarusian professional footballer.

Honours
Slavia Mozyr
Belarusian Premier League champion: 2000
Belarusian Cup winner: 1999–2000

External links
 Profile at teams.by
 

1974 births
Living people
Soviet footballers
Belarusian footballers
Belarusian expatriate footballers
Expatriate footballers in Russia
FC Tyumen players
Russian Premier League players
Belarusian Premier League players
FC Neman Grodno players
FC Dynamo Brest players
FC Slavia Mozyr players
FC Belshina Bobruisk players
FC Naftan Novopolotsk players
FC Bereza-2010 players
Association football defenders
Sportspeople from Brest, Belarus